Scott Harrington may refer to:

Scott Harrington (racing driver) (born 1963), American racing driver
Scott Harrington (ice hockey) (born 1993), Canadian ice hockey player